Imthiyas Slasa (born 7 September 2000) is a Sri Lankan cricketer. He made his first-class debut on 13 March 2020, for Moors Sports Club in the 2019–20 Premier League Tournament.

References

External links
 

2000 births
Living people
Sri Lankan cricketers
Moors Sports Club cricketers
Place of birth missing (living people)